Willapa may refer to:

 Willapa people, an Athapaskan-speaking people in Washington, United States
 Willapa River,  river on the Pacific coast of southwestern Washington, United States
 General Miles, a ship
 Willapa Electric Company, an electric railway and electric utility company incorporated on August 2, 1913
 Willapa Bay, a bay located on the southwest Pacific coast of Washington state in the United States
 Willapa Hills, a geologic, physiographic, and geographic region in southwest Washington